The Dracar was a self-propelled gasoline railcar built by the Drake Railway Automotrice Company in the early 20th century.

Design 
The engine compartment occupied the front , followed by a baggage compartment, and then two passenger sections. As delivered to the Missouri, Oklahoma and Gulf Railway, the Dracar was built with a removable partition to segregate black and white passengers. The white or "first class" section could seat 30; the "colored" section 14. Both sections contained a restroom. The design was based on cars built by the French Westinghouse company for the Arad-Csanad Railway in Hungary. The St Louis Car Company manufactured the car bodies and trucks.

Drake also designed a larger type with a maximum capacity of 73 passengers. This car was powered by a  engine.

History 
The Missouri, Oklahoma and Gulf Railway took delivery of several Dracars and employed them on  runs. Examples included Muskogee–Henryetta, Oklahoma, Durant, Oklahoma–Denison, Texas, and Muskogee–Wagoner, Oklahoma. By 1913 the MO&G had acquired five cars. Each Dracar had a crew of three: motorman, flagman, and conductor.

See also 
 Doodlebug (rail car)

References

External links 
 

Train-related introductions in 1912
Railcars of the United States
Rail transportation in Oklahoma